The Eastern Upper Carniolan subdialect (vzhodnogorenjski govor, vzhodna gorenjščina, vzhodnogorenjsko podnarečje) is a Slovene subdialect in the Upper Carniolan dialect group. It is spoken in the eastern part of Upper Carniola, east of a line running west of Špitalič, Trojane, and Kisovec, then east of Vače and Zgornji Hotič, and then south along the Sava to east of Dol pri Ljubljani.

Phonological and morphological characteristics
The Eastern Upper Carniolan subdialect is a subdialect of the Upper Carniolan dialect. It has preserved pitch accent, except for a small area in Moravče.

References

Slovene dialects
Upper Carniola